Foreign Service Specialists are direct-hire career employees of the United States Department of State and other foreign affairs agencies.  They are members of the United States Foreign Service who provide important technical, support or administrative services in 19 career categories, including Diplomatic Security Agents, Doctors and Physician Assistants, Information Management Specialists, Office Management Specialists, Human Resource Specialists. They serve in over 290 Embassies or Consulates abroad, Washington, D.C. or other locations in the continental United States.

Differences between Officer and Specialist 
Officers hold Article II commissions from the President and are the diplomats of the United States while Specialists perform the essential functions that enable the conduct of diplomacy.  Employment benefits for Specialists and Officers are generally the same. All serve in a series of overseas assignments at U.S. embassies and consulates around the world for much of their careers, with some domestic postings in Washington, D.C. or other locations in the continental United States.
The selection processes for Specialists and Officers differ, although all include an Oral Assessment, medical and security clearances and a suitability review. Additionally, Specialists may be expected to serve within their functional area throughout their careers, while Officers typically will have some assignments over the course of a career that are inter-functional or in a different career track. For example, whatever the career track, entry-level Officers usually serve in one consular or management assignment during the first two tours.

Career tracks
Facilities Maintenance Specialist
Financial Management Officer
General Services Officer
Human Resources Officer
Construction Engineer
Information Management Specialist
Information Management Technical Specialist
Language Officer
Regional English Language Officer
Information Resource Officer
Printing Specialist (Limited Noncareer Appointment)
Health Practitioner
Regional Medical Technologist
Regional Medical Officer
Regional Medical Officer/Psychiatrist
Office Management Specialist 
Diplomatic Courier
Security Engineering Officer
Security Protective Specialist (Limited Noncareer Appointment)
Security Technical Specialist
Diplomatic Security Service Special Agent

In extremely rare cases when no Foreign Service specialists are available, non-career appointees can be considered for entry as FS specialists, providing they meet rigorous standards expected of career members of the Service. Limited Noncareer appointees are not officially part of the Foreign Service and must leave anytime a career person becomes available for their positions.  This is a legal requirement negotiated with various labor organizations.

Allowances and benefits
(1) Foreign Travel Per Diem Allowances: The foreign travel per diem allowances provide for lodging, meals, and incidental expenses when an employee is on temporary duty overseas. While the Office of Allowances is responsible for setting foreign per diem rates, per diem travel policy, both foreign and domestic, is governed by the Federal Travel Regulation (FTR) and not by the DSSR. Employees should check their individual agency’s implementing regulations also. The FTR can be found on the General Services Administration’s website at http://www.gsa.gov/perdiemrates.

(2) Cost-of-Living Allowances: The cost-of-living allowances are those allowances that are designed to reimburse employees for certain excess costs that they incur as a result of their employment overseas. This group includes the Post Allowance (more commonly referred to as the COLA), Foreign Transfer Allowance, Home Service Transfer Allowance, Separate Maintenance Allowance, Education Allowance, and Educational Travel. Cost-of-living allowances are not considered a part of taxable income.

(3) Recruitment and Retention Incentives: These allowances are designed to recruit employees to posts where living conditions may be difficult or dangerous. Post Hardship Differential, Danger Pay, and Difficult-to-Staff Incentive Differential (also known as Service-Needs Differential) are all considered recruitment and retention allowances. They are included in taxable income.  Eligibility for full retirement benefits with 20 years of service if age 50 or older.  Foreign Service pension equal to 1.7% high three years average salary times the number of years served up to 20 years, 1% for each year above 20.

(4) Quarters Allowances: Quarters Allowances, which include the Living Quarters Allowance, Temporary Quarters Subsistence Allowance, and Extraordinary Quarters Allowance, are intended to reimburse employees for substantially all housing costs, either temporary or permanent, at overseas posts where government housing is not provided. These allowances are not included in taxable income.

(5) Other Allowances: Other allowances include ORE (Official Residence Expense), Representation Allowance, evacuation-related payments, and Advance of Pay.

See also
 Foreign Service Officer
 United States Foreign Service
 United States Department of State

References

External links
Foreign Service Specialist Careers site at the State Department

United States Department of State
Foreign relations of the United States